Edward M. Catich (1906–April 14, 1979) was an American Roman Catholic priest, teacher, and calligrapher. He is noted for the fullest development of the thesis that the inscribed Roman square capitals of the Augustan age and afterward owed their form (and their characteristic serifs) wholly to the use of the flat brush, rather than to the exigencies of the chisel or other stone cutting tools.

Life
His parents died when he was 11, and he and three brothers (including his twin) were taken by train to the orphanage of the Loyal Order of Moose, the Mooseheart campus near Aurora, Illinois.

At the orphanage he apprenticed under sign-writer Walter Heberling. After graduating high school in 1924, Catich toured with a Mooseheart band, and then went to Chicago, where he played music in bands. Catich studied art at the School of the Art Institute of Chicago from 1926–29, and supported himself as a union sign-writer. Catich attended  where he worked as the leader of the school band. He received a master's degree in art at University of Iowa in Iowa City.

In 1935, Catich traveled to Rome to study at Pontifical Gregorian University for the Catholic priesthood, where he also made a study of archaeology and paleography. He was ordained in 1938 for the Diocese of Davenport and returned to Iowa to teach art, math, engineering, and music at St. Ambrose. As a priest, he served in parishes of the Diocese of Peoria, including ones in Atkinson and Hooppole.

Throughout much of the late 1940s and early 1950s, Catich made several trips to Massachusetts to work on his calligraphy with W.A. Dwiggins. It was during these trips that he began to explore deep into the Trajan column that would become his life's work. During the 1950s, 1960s, and even into the 1970s, Catich would make many trips to Rome to explore the Roman capitals.

Catich taught at St. Ambrose for forty years, until his death in 1979. The Davenport, Iowa, university now holds some 4,000 of his works, many from his legacy to Professor John Schmits, housed at the Edward M. Catich Memorial Gallery. The gallery was originally his studio and press at the Galvin Fine Arts Center and was built with a donation from Hallmark Cards, where several of his students worked. In the years following his death, many of Catich's important theories about the Roman Capitals would be adopted.

He had ties to the Los Angeles County Museum of Art, Encyclopædia Britannica, and the Houghton Library at Harvard, and was a founder of the Catholic Art Association.

Works

His calligraphy and stone cutting work won Catich an international reputation, and he created many slate inscriptions using his brush and chisel technique. He created two typefaces, Petrarch and Catfish. Many of his books were published under his own press, The Catfish Press, which operated out of his studio at the university.

Besides calligraphy, Catich was accomplished at liturgical art, working in slate, stained glass, watercolor, and print, and he played the trumpet, cello, and harmonica.

Other institutions which hold his work include:
 Chapel + Cultural Center at Rensselaer
 Harvard College
 Los Angeles County Museum of Art
 Encyclopædia Britannica's corporate headquarters
 Reed College
 Morton Arboretum
 University of Pittsburgh's Cathedral of Learning and Benedum Hall

The Origin of the Serif

Studying in Rome as a seminarian in the late 1930s, he made a thorough study of the letter forms of the epigraphy on Trajan's Column.

While the brushed-origin thesis had been proposed in the nineteenth century, Catich, having worked as a union sign painter, made a complete study and proposed a convincing ductus by which the forms were created, using a flat brush and then chisel. He promulgated his views in two works, Letters Redrawn from the Trajan Inscription in Rome and The Origin of the Serif: Brush Writing and Roman Letters.

While the thesis is not universally accepted, electioneering posters excavated in Pompeii show unincised Imperial Roman capital titles (followed by body text in rustic capitals) brush-painted on certain walls.

Awards
 Eighth Annual Frederick W. Goudy Award, 1976
 Inaugural John McMullen Award

Bibliography
 Edward M. Catich. "A Priest Speaks on Chalice-Design." The Catholic Art Quarterly, volume 14, number 2. 1951.
 Edward M. Catich. "Sentimentality in Christian Art" The Furrow 10 (1959)
 Edward M. Catich. Letters Redrawn from the Trajan Inscription in Rome. The Catfish Press, 1961.
 Edward M. Catich. Eric Gill: His social and artistic roots. The Prairie Press, 1964.
 Edward M. Catich. The Origin of the Serif: Brush writing and Roman letters. The Catfish Press, 1968.
 Edward M. Catich. Reed, Pen and Brush: Alphabets for writing and lettering. The Catfish Press, 1972.
 Edward M. Catich. The Trajan Inscription: An essay. Society of Printers, 1973.

References

External links
Edward M. Catich Memorial Gallery 
Edward M. Catich Rubbings  at the Newberry Library

1906 births
1979 deaths
Roman Catholic Diocese of Davenport
20th-century American Roman Catholic priests
University of Iowa alumni
St. Ambrose University faculty
People from Stevensville, Montana
American calligraphers
Latin-script calligraphy
American palaeographers
Religious leaders from Iowa
Catholics from Montana